A very small business (VSB) is a company that is at the lower end, in terms of size, of companies that are considered small and medium enterprise. The actual definition of what size companies classify as VSBs varies from region to region, but upper limit is usually considered to be 25–50 employees.

See also
 Small office/home office

Business models
Small business
Business terms